Aziz Tamoyan (July 1, 1933 in Zovuni, Armenia – January 2, 2021) was a Yazidi politician and the president of the Yezidi National Union in Armenia.

On September 30, 1989, he was elected chairman of the National Union of Yazidis of Armenia, and in 1997 he became chairman of the National Union of Yazidis of the World.

See also 

Yazidis in Armenia

References 

1933 births
2021 deaths
People from Kotayk Province
Armenian Yazidis
Yazidis in Armenia
Armenian human rights activists